Nadine Trintignant (née Marquand; born 11 November 1934) is a French film director, producer, editor, screenwriter, and novelist. She is known for making films that surround the topic of family and relationships, such as Ça n'arrive qu'aux autres and L'été prochain. Her film Mon amour, mon amour was nominated for the Palme d'Or at the 1967 Cannes Film Festival.

Biography
Trintignant was born in Nice. She is the sister of the late actors Christian Marquand and Serge Marquand. In 1960, she married French actor Jean-Louis Trintignant, who had already starred in several of her early films. The couple had three children: a daughter, actress Marie Trintignant; another daughter, Pauline; and a son, actor and screenwriter Vincent Trintignant-Corneau. They separated in 1976. Following their split, Nadine Trintignant started a relationship with French director Alain Corneau, who later adopted her children Marie and Vincent. Trintignant and Corneau lived together for 37 years until his death in 2010.

Trintignant has suffered the loss of two of her three children. In 1970, her nine-month-old daughter Pauline died of crib death, and in 2003 her older daughter Marie died from injuries inflicted by her boyfriend, French musician Bertrand Cantat, during a domestic dispute.

In her films, Trintignant has focused on family and relationships, often borrowing from her own life. Much of her work took place during the 1970s, a time of great advancement for woman filmmakers in France. Trintignant's interest in feminist issues and the perils of the heterosexual couple can be seen in many of her films, such as Mon amour, Mon amour (1967) and Le voyage des noces (1976). In 1971 she signed the Manifesto of the 343, published in the French magazine Le Nouvel Observateur. The article was signed by 343 women who admitted to having had abortions in order to end the ban on abortion and raise awareness of female reproductive rights.

Career

Beginnings

At age 15, Trintignant's first experience with the film industry was as a lab assistant. Thereafter she held various small positions, mainly in editing, before turning to directing, with her first credited job as assistant editor of the 1955 film Du rififi chez les hommes. Following Rififi, Trintignant edited the films Si Paris nous était conté (1956), Une Parisienne (1957), Une Vie (1965), Léon Morin, Prêtre (1961), L'eau a la bouche (1960), Le Coeur Battant (1961), Le Petit Soldat (1963), Les grands Chemins (1963), Le Chemin de la Mauvaise Route (1963), and Les Pas perdus (1964).

Film director

Trintignant made her directorial debut with her 1965 short film Fragilité, ton nom est femme. Two years later she wrote and directed Mon amour, mon amour, a dramatic film about a young woman's love affair with an architect and her secret struggle over whether to have an abortion. The film was nominated for the Palme d'Or at the 1967 Cannes Film Festival.

Following the death of her nine-month-old daughter Pauline in 1970, Trintignant wrote and directed Ça n’arrive qu’aux autres, a semi-autobiographical film related to her personal tragedy. The 1971 film starred Catherine Deneuve and Marcello Mastroianni as a couple coping with the death of their infant daughter. Trintignant blurred the boundaries between fiction and her life in several ways: she cast her brother Serge Marquand as Deneuve's character's brother, included her older daughter Marie in several scenes, and used actual images and footage of her daughter Pauline to depict the deceased child in the film.

Trintignant's next film, Défense de savoir, was released in 1973, followed by Le Voyage de noces in 1976. In the 1980s she wrote and directed many films focusing on relationships through a feminist lens, such as Premier Voyage (1980), L'été prochain (1985), and La maison de Jade (1988), despite the fact that according to critics such as Nina Darnton of The New York Times, the "fire of the women's liberation movement [was] no longer fanned to so bright a flame" by then.

In 1991 Trintignant joined 30 filmmakers to create Contre L'Oubli for Amnesty International. The project consisted of 30 short films, each directed by a different filmmaker paired with a public personality and dedicated to make a plea for human rights, focusing on a specific political prisoner. Trintignant collaborated with her daughter Marie for the segment on José Ramon Garcia-Gomez of Mexico.

In the 1990s and 2000s Trintignant continued to make films in collaboration with her family: Rêveuse Jeunesse (1994) and Fugeuses (1995) starred Marie; L'insoumise (1996) starred both Marie and Jean-Louis Trintignant, and was co-written by their son Vincent; and L'île Bleu was co-written again with Vincent. Trintignant's most recent directorial credit is the 2003 film Colette, une femme libre, a film that once again starred Marie. Marie's sudden death occurred during the film's production, but her scenes had already been shot, so Trintignant completed the film and dedicated it to her daughter.

Novelist

Trintignant has written several novels, including Ton Chapeau au vestiaire (1997), Combien d'enfants (2001), and Le Jeune homme de la rue de France (2002). After her daughter Marie died, Trintignant wrote the memoir Marie, ma fille (2003). She has since written several books about her personal life: her autobiography J'ai été jeune un jour (2006); a collection of short stories depicting her pain after Marie's death, Un étrange peine (2007); a memoir of her late partner Alain Corneau, Vers d'autres matins (2012); and an homage to her mother, La voilette de ma mère (2014).

Filmography

Awards and nominations 
Trintignant's 1967 film Mon amour mon amour, which she wrote and directed, was nominated for the Palme d'Or at the Cannes Film Festival that year.

References

External links

1934 births
Living people
People from Nice
French film actresses
French film directors
French film producers
French memoirists
20th-century French actresses
French women film directors
French women film producers
French women screenwriters
French screenwriters
French women memoirists
French people of Arab descent
French people of Spanish descent
Signatories of the 1971 Manifesto of the 343